India at Home is a family-owned supermarket chain based in Melbourne with retail stores across different suburbs around Melbourne, Victoria selling a wide range of Indian groceries. The company, founded by Rajesh Bhatia in the year 2005, has over 6 retail stores across Melbourne, Victoria and as well as an online grocery store.

History 
The company opened its first retail store in Dandenong in August of 2006. As of November 2019, India At Home has more than 6 retail stores being operated either under their own management in Boxhill, Clayton, Narrewarren, Cranbourne and other suburbs of Victoria.

India at Home also operates many stores under franchise model. In 2014, the company started providing franchise for its retail stores to local entrepreneurs.

Participation in IndusFood 2020 
India at Home, along with many other retail brands, is expected to participate in InduFood — the flagship global trade show organised by Trade Promotion Council of India — an apex trade and investment promotion organization notified in the Foreign Trade Policy, and supported by the Department of Commerce, Government of India.

See also

List of supermarket chains in Oceania

References

External links

Supermarkets of Australia
Australian companies established in 2005
Retail companies established in 2005
Companies based in Melbourne
Indian-Australian culture and history